Zhang Yuning (Simplified Chinese: 张玉宁; Traditional Chinese: 張玉寧; Pinyin: Zhāng Yùníng) (born May 25, 1977 in Shenyang) is a former Chinese international footballer. After retiring from football he took up coaching to become the reserve team coach for Wenzhou Tomorrow until he left at the beginning of the 2010 league season.

Playing career
Zhang started his football career with his local football team Liaoning F.C. where he progressed to their senior team in 1994 league campaign at the dawn of full professionalism within the Chinese game. He was initially loaned out to third-tier club Beijing Shougang before he went on to make his debut for Liaoning where he soon made a name for himself when he was the club's top goalscorer in the 1997 campaign. By the following season he would show himself to be a prolific striker who helped guide Liaoning to promotion to the top tier. Once in the top division Zhang quickly adapted to the higher demands and narrowly saw Liaoning miss out on winning the league title.

As a young, tall and strong prolific centre forward, Zhang quickly caught the imagination of the Chinese tabloid press who often referred to him as the David Beckham of China, however at the height of his popularity on April 26, 2000 he was involved in a serious car accident. It was discovered that Zhang was drink driving while driving some teammates and friends home, however while Zhang sustained minor injuries his teammate Qu Leheng sustained serious injuries, which resulted in Qu being left a paraplegic and consigned to a wheelchair for life. Qu would go on to successfully sue Zhang 2.34 million yuan (282,000 US dollars) for compensation on November 22, 2004. Zhang would also go on to make a public apology to Qu and despite publicly believing that the compensation was especially high he decided to abnegate his right to ask for a retrial.

While his trail to Qu went on Zhang was able to return to his football career and made his international debut against Egypt in a friendly on January 17, 2001 that ended in a 0–0 draw. English club Leicester City were interested in signing Zhang on loan in November 2001 however, the Home Office was doubtful that he had not played regularly for the national team, rejecting his application for a work permit. Leicester did rekindle their interest in him in November 2004, after being recommended by Bobby Houghton, though he again failed in his work permit. Instead Zhang signed on for Shanghai Shenhua for a reported ten million yuan in the 2003 league season where he went on to win the league title in his debut campaign with them. Unfortunately in 2013 the Chinese Football Association would revoke the league title after it was discovered the Shenhua General manager Lou Shifang had bribed officials to be bias to Shenhua in games that season.

Unable to replicate his performances from his youth Shenhua decided to loan Zhang to Australian side Queensland Roar where he played under Frank Farina. His time at the club was not a success and he only made six appearances, which was not helped by his pack-a-day smoking habit. Shenhua would eventually decide to sell Zhang back to his hometown club of Liaoning for 600,000 yuan in 2008, however he would not play for them and decided to retire at the end of the season.

Career statistics

Club
Last update: 23 Nov 2015

International goals

Honours

Player

Club
Liaoning F.C.
Chinese FA Super Cup: 1999

Shanghai Shenhua
Chinese Jia-A League: 2003 (revoked due to match-fixing scandal)

Individual
Chinese Jia-B League Top Goalscorer: 1998

References

External links
 Player profile with Queensland Roar FC
 

Chinese footballers
Beijing International Studies University people
1977 births
Chinese football managers
Footballers from Shenyang
Chinese expatriate footballers
China international footballers
Liaoning F.C. players
Shanghai Shenhua F.C. players
Brisbane Roar FC players
A-League Men players
Living people
Association football forwards